The 1973 VFL season was the 77th season of the Victorian Football League (VFL), the highest level senior Australian rules football competition in Victoria. The season featured twelve clubs, ran from 7 April until 29 September, and comprised a 22-game home-and-away season followed by a finals series featuring the top five clubs.

The premiership was won by the Richmond Football Club for the eighth time, after it defeated  by 30 points in the 1973 VFL Grand Final.

Rule changes
One of the most significant innovations that came into force in 1973 was the implementation of a painted centre diamond area with 45-metre long sides, with a maximum of four players from each team permitted to stand within the diamond at centre bounces. Following a long period of lobbying by the VFL to the Australian Football Council for its introduction, the centre diamond was initially subject to a 12-month trial period. The purpose of this innovation was to try and solve the problem of congestion at centre bounces, as well as giving skilled players more space to benefit their teams.

Premiership season
The home-and-away season consisted of 22 rounds, with teams facing each other twice; matches 12 to 22 were the "home-and-way reverse" of matches 1 to 11.

At the conclusion of the home-and-away fixtures, the 1973 VFL Premiers were determined by the specific format and conventions of the "McIntyre final five system".

Round 1

|- bgcolor="#CCCCFF"
| Home team
| Home team score
| Away team
| Away team score
| Venue
| Crowd
| Date
|- bgcolor="#FFFFFF"
| 
| 9.12 (66)
| 
| 14.14 (98)
| MCG
| 44,737
| 7 April 1973
|- bgcolor="#FFFFFF"
| 
| 20.17 (137)
| 
| 12.15 (87)
| Junction Oval
| 14,988
| 7 April 1973
|- bgcolor="#FFFFFF"
| 
| 19.13 (127)
| 
| 19.15 (129)
| Windy Hill
| 27,959
| 7 April 1973
|- bgcolor="#FFFFFF"
| 
| 17.22 (124)
| 
| 6.12 (48)
| Victoria Park
| 23,412
| 7 April 1973
|- bgcolor="#FFFFFF"
| 
| 14.14 (98)
| 
| 9.16 (70)
| Arden Street Oval
| 15,934
| 7 April 1973
|- bgcolor="#FFFFFF"
| 
| 10.8 (68)
| 
| 18.16 (124)
| Kardinia Park
| 26,130
| 7 April 1973

Round 2

|- bgcolor="#CCCCFF"
| Home team
| Home team score
| Away team
| Away team score
| Venue
| Crowd
| Date
|- bgcolor="#FFFFFF"
| 
| 14.14 (98)
| 
| 13.22 (100)
| Glenferrie Oval
| 13,128
| 14 April 1973
|- bgcolor="#FFFFFF"
| 
| 18.15 (123)
| 
| 14.12 (96)
| Princes Park
| 29,185
| 14 April 1973
|- bgcolor="#FFFFFF"
| 
| 18.19 (127)
| 
| 16.14 (110)
| MCG
| 29,665
| 14 April 1973
|- bgcolor="#FFFFFF"
| 
| 20.8 (128)
| 
| 10.11 (71)
| Moorabbin Oval
| 23,662
| 14 April 1973
|- bgcolor="#FFFFFF"
| 
| 15.19 (109)
| 
| 21.20 (146)
| Lake Oval
| 16,260
| 14 April 1973
|- bgcolor="#FFFFFF"
| 
| 11.16 (82)
| 
| 14.18 (102)
| Western Oval
| 24,794
| 14 April 1973

Round 3

|- bgcolor="#CCCCFF"
| Home team
| Home team score
| Away team
| Away team score
| Venue
| Crowd
| Date
|- bgcolor="#FFFFFF"
| 
| 21.23 (149)
| 
| 11.13 (79)
| Victoria Park
| 49,552
| 21 April 1973
|- bgcolor="#FFFFFF"
| 
| 12.9 (81)
| 
| 17.8 (110)
| Moorabbin Oval
| 33,022
| 21 April 1973
|- bgcolor="#FFFFFF"
| 
| 11.18 (84)
| 
| 10.18 (78)
| Arden Street Oval
| 18,704
| 21 April 1973
|- bgcolor="#FFFFFF"
| 
| 17.16 (118)
| 
| 20.15 (135)
| Lake Oval
| 13,199
| 23 April 1973
|- bgcolor="#FFFFFF"
| 
| 11.9 (75)
| 
| 11.16 (82)
| MCG
| 49,439
| 23 April 1973
|- bgcolor="#FFFFFF"
| 
| 27.8 (170)
| 
| 15.12 (102)
| VFL Park
| 32,045
| 23 April 1973

Round 4

|- bgcolor="#CCCCFF"
| Home team
| Home team score
| Away team
| Away team score
| Venue
| Crowd
| Date
|- bgcolor="#FFFFFF"
| 
| 11.18 (84)
| 
| 14.20 (104)
| MCG
| 48,923
| 25 April 1973
|- bgcolor="#FFFFFF"
| 
| 8.12 (60)
| 
| 19.16 (130)
| VFL Park
| 49,552
| 25 April 1973
|- bgcolor="#FFFFFF"
| 
| 17.16 (118)
| 
| 12.14 (86)
| Kardinia Park
| 14,739
| 28 April 1973
|- bgcolor="#FFFFFF"
| 
| 13.9 (87)
| 
| 13.16 (94)
| Junction Oval
| 16,101
| 28 April 1973
|- bgcolor="#FFFFFF"
| 
| 14.11 (95)
| 
| 12.11 (83)
| Princes Park
| 27,913
| 28 April 1973
|- bgcolor="#FFFFFF"
| 
| 8.19 (67)
| 
| 17.13 (115)
| Western Oval
| 25,314
| 28 April 1973

Round 5

|- bgcolor="#CCCCFF"
| Home team
| Home team score
| Away team
| Away team score
| Venue
| Crowd
| Date
|- bgcolor="#FFFFFF"
| 
| 13.13 (91)
| 
| 16.14 (110)
| MCG
| 37,667
| 5 May 1973
|- bgcolor="#FFFFFF"
| 
| 16.26 (122)
| 
| 15.16 (106)
| Windy Hill
| 19,007
| 5 May 1973
|- bgcolor="#FFFFFF"
| 
| 6.12 (48)
| 
| 10.16 (76)
| Lake Oval
| 13,513
| 5 May 1973
|- bgcolor="#FFFFFF"
| 
| 18.16 (124)
| 
| 16.12 (108)
| Glenferrie Oval
| 11,402
| 5 May 1973
|- bgcolor="#FFFFFF"
| 
| 13.20 (98)
| 
| 15.19 (109)
| Arden Street Oval
| 27,048
| 5 May 1973
|- bgcolor="#FFFFFF"
| 
| 15.15 (105)
| 
| 10.8 (68)
| VFL Park
| 19,654
| 5 May 1973

Round 6

|- bgcolor="#CCCCFF"
| Home team
| Home team score
| Away team
| Away team score
| Venue
| Crowd
| Date
|- bgcolor="#FFFFFF"
| 
| 15.17 (107)
| 
| 12.13 (85)
| Junction Oval
| 10,706
| 12 May 1973
|- bgcolor="#FFFFFF"
| 
| 15.10 (100)
| 
| 10.16 (76)
| Victoria Park
| 21,360
| 12 May 1973
|- bgcolor="#FFFFFF"
| 
| 11.14 (80)
| 
| 14.14 (98)
| Kardinia Park
| 15,305
| 12 May 1973
|- bgcolor="#FFFFFF"
| 
| 18.13 (121)
| 
| 21.14 (140)
| Moorabbin Oval
| 23,120
| 12 May 1973
|- bgcolor="#FFFFFF"
| 
| 18.20 (128)
| 
| 15.12 (102)
| MCG
| 54,139
| 12 May 1973
|- bgcolor="#FFFFFF"
| 
| 18.16 (124)
| 
| 11.14 (80)
| VFL Park
| 10,020
| 12 May 1973

Round 7

|- bgcolor="#CCCCFF"
| Home team
| Home team score
| Away team
| Away team score
| Venue
| Crowd
| Date
|- bgcolor="#FFFFFF"
| 
| 17.10 (112)
| 
| 12.11 (83)
| MCG
| 16,075
| 19 May 1973
|- bgcolor="#FFFFFF"
| 
| 14.9 (93)
| 
| 13.12 (90)
| Western Oval
| 14,953
| 19 May 1973
|- bgcolor="#FFFFFF"
| 
| 20.24 (144)
| 
| 11.8 (74)
| Windy Hill
| 26,907
| 19 May 1973
|- bgcolor="#FFFFFF"
| 
| 16.23 (119)
| 
| 8.12 (60)
| Princes Park
| 43,531
| 19 May 1973
|- bgcolor="#FFFFFF"
| 
| 19.15 (129)
| 
| 9.14 (68)
| Glenferrie Oval
| 11,621
| 19 May 1973
|- bgcolor="#FFFFFF"
| 
| 12.8 (80)
| 
| 16.21 (117)
| VFL Park
| 19,539
| 19 May 1973

Round 8

|- bgcolor="#CCCCFF"
| Home team
| Home team score
| Away team
| Away team score
| Venue
| Crowd
| Date
|- bgcolor="#FFFFFF"
| 
| 15.13 (103)
| 
| 10.8 (68)
| Victoria Park
| 20,822
| 26 May 1973
|- bgcolor="#FFFFFF"
| 
| 10.22 (82)
| 
| 16.23 (119)
| MCG
| 32,613
| 26 May 1973
|- bgcolor="#FFFFFF"
| 
| 16.10 (106)
| 
| 8.12 (60)
| Moorabbin Oval
| 15,114
| 26 May 1973
|- bgcolor="#FFFFFF"
| 
| 8.8 (56)
| 
| 8.8 (56)
| Arden Street Oval
| 16,148
| 26 May 1973
|- bgcolor="#FFFFFF"
| 
| 7.9 (51)
| 
| 19.16 (130)
| Lake Oval
| 14,659
| 26 May 1973
|- bgcolor="#FFFFFF"
| 
| 10.11 (71)
| 
| 12.9 (81)
| VFL Park
| 25,603
| 26 May 1973

Round 9

|- bgcolor="#CCCCFF"
| Home team
| Home team score
| Away team
| Away team score
| Venue
| Crowd
| Date
|- bgcolor="#FFFFFF"
| 
| 14.6 (90)
| 
| 18.13 (121)
| Kardinia Park
| 18,868
| 4 June 1973
|- bgcolor="#FFFFFF"
| 
| 9.14 (68)
| 
| 10.14 (74)
| Western Oval
| 17,973
| 4 June 1973
|- bgcolor="#FFFFFF"
| 
| 16.8 (104)
| 
| 7.15 (57)
| Junction Oval
| 10,119
| 4 June 1973
|- bgcolor="#FFFFFF"
| 
| 19.19 (133)
| 
| 13.14 (92)
| Princes Park
| 39,646
| 4 June 1973
|- bgcolor="#FFFFFF"
| 
| 11.12 (78)
| 
| 8.16 (64)
| Moorabbin Oval
| 22,521
| 4 June 1973
|- bgcolor="#FFFFFF"
| 
| 10.6 (66)
| 
| 15.15 (105)
| VFL Park
| 55,827
| 4 June 1973

Round 10

|- bgcolor="#CCCCFF"
| Home team
| Home team score
| Away team
| Away team score
| Venue
| Crowd
| Date
|- bgcolor="#FFFFFF"
| 
| 11.14 (80)
| 
| 7.12 (54)
| Arden Street Oval
| 16,387
| 9 June 1973
|- bgcolor="#FFFFFF"
| 
| 15.17 (107)
| 
| 14.13 (97)
| Windy Hill
| 16,632
| 9 June 1973
|- bgcolor="#FFFFFF"
| 
| 9.8 (62)
| 
| 13.14 (92)
| Lake Oval
| 10,726
| 9 June 1973
|- bgcolor="#FFFFFF"
| 
| 20.19 (139)
| 
| 11.15 (81)
| MCG
| 19,900
| 9 June 1973
|- bgcolor="#FFFFFF"
| 
| 14.11 (95)
| 
| 15.18 (108)
| Glenferrie Oval
| 19,963
| 9 June 1973
|- bgcolor="#FFFFFF"
| 
| 13.13 (91)
| 
| 9.11 (65)
| VFL Park
| 18,205
| 9 June 1973

Round 11

|- bgcolor="#CCCCFF"
| Home team
| Home team score
| Away team
| Away team score
| Venue
| Crowd
| Date
|- bgcolor="#FFFFFF"
| 
| 13.12 (90)
| 
| 12.9 (81)
| MCG
| 32,957
| 16 June 1973
|- bgcolor="#FFFFFF"
| 
| 7.16 (58)
| 
| 17.7 (109)
| Western Oval
| 16,733
| 16 June 1973
|- bgcolor="#FFFFFF"
| 
| 23.16 (154)
| 
| 16.16 (112)
| Victoria Park
| 31,754
| 16 June 1973
|- bgcolor="#FFFFFF"
| 
| 16.8 (104)
| 
| 11.15 (81)
| Kardinia Park
| 12,786
| 16 June 1973
|- bgcolor="#FFFFFF"
| 
| 13.13 (91)
| 
| 9.13 (67)
| Moorabbin Oval
| 25,081
| 16 June 1973
|- bgcolor="#FFFFFF"
| 
| 11.10 (76)
| 
| 17.17 (119)
| VFL Park
| 9,436
| 16 June 1973

Round 12

|- bgcolor="#CCCCFF"
| Home team
| Home team score
| Away team
| Away team score
| Venue
| Crowd
| Date
|- bgcolor="#FFFFFF"
| 
| 12.13 (85)
| 
| 10.10 (70)
| Glenferrie Oval
| 12,380
| 23 June 1973
|- bgcolor="#FFFFFF"
| 
| 17.12 (114)
| 
| 9.13 (67)
| Princes Park
| 14,202
| 23 June 1973
|- bgcolor="#FFFFFF"
| 
| 11.14 (80)
| 
| 6.18 (54)
| Moorabbin Oval
| 24,262
| 23 June 1973
|- bgcolor="#FFFFFF"
| 
| 15.21 (111)
| 
| 13.17 (95)
| MCG
| 43,892
| 23 June 1973
|- bgcolor="#FFFFFF"
| 
| 12.5 (77)
| 
| 15.9 (99)
| Lake Oval
| 12,484
| 23 June 1973
|- bgcolor="#FFFFFF"
| 
| 10.15 (75)
| 
| 13.11 (89)
| VFL Park
| 7,016
| 23 June 1973

Round 13

|- bgcolor="#CCCCFF"
| Home team
| Home team score
| Away team
| Away team score
| Venue
| Crowd
| Date
|- bgcolor="#FFFFFF"
| 
| 10.11 (71)
| 
| 20.11 (131)
| Junction Oval
| 14,776
| 30 June 1973
|- bgcolor="#FFFFFF"
| 
| 20.19 (139)
| 
| 16.14 (110)
| Windy Hill
| 13,042
| 30 June 1973
|- bgcolor="#FFFFFF"
| 
| 13.17 (95)
| 
| 14.6 (90)
| Victoria Park
| 18,253
| 30 June 1973
|- bgcolor="#FFFFFF"
| 
| 15.15 (105)
| 
| 15.22 (112)
| MCG
| 25,787
| 30 June 1973
|- bgcolor="#FFFFFF"
| 
| 16.19 (115)
| 
| 16.11 (107)
| Arden Street Oval
| 19,355
| 30 June 1973
|- bgcolor="#FFFFFF"
| 
| 13.11 (89)
| 
| 21.7 (133)
| VFL Park
| 13,219
| 30 June 1973

Round 14

|- bgcolor="#CCCCFF"
| Home team
| Home team score
| Away team
| Away team score
| Venue
| Crowd
| Date
|- bgcolor="#FFFFFF"
| 
| 11.12 (78)
| 
| 17.15 (117)
| Arden Street Oval
| 19,114
| 7 July 1973
|- bgcolor="#FFFFFF"
| 
| 15.13 (103)
| 
| 12.10 (82)
| Victoria Park
| 25,312
| 7 July 1973
|- bgcolor="#FFFFFF"
| 
| 18.15 (123)
| 
| 12.6 (78)
| Lake Oval
| 9,681
| 7 July 1973
|- bgcolor="#FFFFFF"
| 
| 19.20 (134)
| 
| 14.13 (97)
| MCG
| 13,105
| 7 July 1973
|- bgcolor="#FFFFFF"
| 
| 14.24 (108)
| 
| 12.14 (86)
| Glenferrie Oval
| 18,316
| 7 July 1973
|- bgcolor="#FFFFFF"
| 
| 21.6 (132)
| 
| 13.19 (97)
| VFL Park
| 12,417
| 7 July 1973

Round 15

|- bgcolor="#CCCCFF"
| Home team
| Home team score
| Away team
| Away team score
| Venue
| Crowd
| Date
|- bgcolor="#FFFFFF"
| 
| 12.7 (79)
| 
| 20.21 (141)
| Western Oval
| 11,115
| 14 July 1973
|- bgcolor="#FFFFFF"
| 
| 16.12 (108)
| 
| 13.18 (96)
| Junction Oval
| 9,886
| 14 July 1973
|- bgcolor="#FFFFFF"
| 
| 23.13 (151)
| 
| 18.8 (116)
| Windy Hill
| 22,437
| 14 July 1973
|- bgcolor="#FFFFFF"
| 
| 18.14 (122)
| 
| 12.9 (81)
| Princes Park
| 22,283
| 14 July 1973
|- bgcolor="#FFFFFF"
| 
| 13.10 (88)
| 
| 13.18 (96)
| Kardinia Park
| 15,892
| 14 July 1973
|- bgcolor="#FFFFFF"
| 
| 13.12 (90)
| 
| 11.11 (77)
| VFL Park
| 31,502
| 14 July 1973

Round 16

|- bgcolor="#CCCCFF"
| Home team
| Home team score
| Away team
| Away team score
| Venue
| Crowd
| Date
|- bgcolor="#FFFFFF"
| 
| 14.16 (100)
| 
| 13.15 (93)
| Moorabbin Oval
| 17,454
| 21 July 1973
|- bgcolor="#FFFFFF"
| 
| 6.9 (45)
| 
| 9.11 (65)
| Western Oval
| 10,987
| 21 July 1973
|- bgcolor="#FFFFFF"
| 
| 16.14 (110)
| 
| 9.19 (73)
| MCG
| 30,492
| 21 July 1973
|- bgcolor="#FFFFFF"
| 
| 12.10 (82)
| 
| 11.15 (81)
| Kardinia Park
| 16,746
| 21 July 1973
|- bgcolor="#FFFFFF"
| 
| 12.19 (91)
| 
| 11.14 (80)
| Junction Oval
| 14,800
| 21 July 1973
|- bgcolor="#FFFFFF"
| 
| 10.11 (71)
| 
| 11.10 (76)
| VFL Park
| 25,650
| 21 July 1973

Round 17

|- bgcolor="#CCCCFF"
| Home team
| Home team score
| Away team
| Away team score
| Venue
| Crowd
| Date
|- bgcolor="#FFFFFF"
| 
| 15.12 (102)
| 
| 10.19 (79)
| Windy Hill
| 21,469
| 28 July 1973
|- bgcolor="#FFFFFF"
| 
| 15.17 (107)
| 
| 10.21 (81)
| Princes Park
| 28,592
| 28 July 1973
|- bgcolor="#FFFFFF"
| 
| 19.16 (130)
| 
| 14.7 (91)
| Lake Oval
| 13,637
| 28 July 1973
|- bgcolor="#FFFFFF"
| 
| 15.10 (100)
| 
| 9.9 (63)
| Glenferrie Oval
| 12,386
| 28 July 1973
|- bgcolor="#FFFFFF"
| 
| 12.15 (87)
| 
| 17.24 (126)
| MCG
| 37,838
| 28 July 1973
|- bgcolor="#FFFFFF"
| 
| 21.15 (141)
| 
| 13.14 (92)
| VFL Park
| 13,546
| 28 July 1973

Round 18

|- bgcolor="#CCCCFF"
| Home team
| Home team score
| Away team
| Away team score
| Venue
| Crowd
| Date
|- bgcolor="#FFFFFF"
| 
| 14.11 (95)
| 
| 14.10 (94)
| Kardinia Park
| 13,546
| 4 August 1973
|- bgcolor="#FFFFFF"
| 
| 15.20 (110)
| 
| 12.14 (86)
| Moorabbin Oval
| 15,217
| 4 August 1973
|- bgcolor="#FFFFFF"
| 
| 15.14 (104)
| 
| 13.14 (92)
| MCG
| 20,578
| 4 August 1973
|- bgcolor="#FFFFFF"
| 
| 13.13 (91)
| 
| 14.10 (94)
| Arden Street Oval
| 21,071
| 4 August 1973
|- bgcolor="#FFFFFF"
| 
| 19.7 (121)
| 
| 15.16 (106)
| Victoria Park
| 37,660
| 4 August 1973
|- bgcolor="#FFFFFF"
| 
| 12.14 (86)
| 
| 11.12 (78)
| VFL Park
| 15,255
| 4 August 1973

Round 19

|- bgcolor="#CCCCFF"
| Home team
| Home team score
| Away team
| Away team score
| Venue
| Crowd
| Date
|- bgcolor="#FFFFFF"
| 
| 11.11 (77)
| 
| 12.10 (82)
| Glenferrie Oval
| 20,236
| 11 August 1973
|- bgcolor="#FFFFFF"
| 
| 10.8 (68)
| 
| 10.14 (74)
| Western Oval
| 13,581
| 11 August 1973
|- bgcolor="#FFFFFF"
| 
| 17.13 (115)
| 
| 15.11 (101)
| Windy Hill
| 18,008
| 11 August 1973
|- bgcolor="#FFFFFF"
| 
| 20.17 (137)
| 
| 11.14 (80)
| Princes Park
| 22,181
| 11 August 1973
|- bgcolor="#FFFFFF"
| 
| 10.19 (79)
| 
| 19.10 (124)
| Junction Oval
| 19,103
| 11 August 1973
|- bgcolor="#FFFFFF"
| 
| 13.8 (86)
| 
| 11.17 (83)
| VFL Park
| 19,477
| 11 August 1973

Round 20

|- bgcolor="#CCCCFF"
| Home team
| Home team score
| Away team
| Away team score
| Venue
| Crowd
| Date
|- bgcolor="#FFFFFF"
| 
| 11.11 (77)
| 
| 15.8 (98)
| Glenferrie Oval
| 16,952
| 18 August 1973
|- bgcolor="#FFFFFF"
| 
| 8.11 (59)
| 
| 14.16 (100)
| Victoria Park
| 28,286
| 18 August 1973
|- bgcolor="#FFFFFF"
| 
| 9.10 (64)
| 
| 7.6 (48)
| Arden Street Oval
| 11,121
| 18 August 1973
|- bgcolor="#FFFFFF"
| 
| 10.13 (73)
| 
| 17.8 (110)
| MCG
| 12,563
| 18 August 1973
|- bgcolor="#FFFFFF"
| 
| 15.11 (101)
| 
| 14.21 (105)
| Lake Oval
| 8,584
| 18 August 1973
|- bgcolor="#FFFFFF"
| 
| 10.7 (67)
| 
| 17.9 (111)
| VFL Park
| 36,160
| 18 August 1973

Round 21

|- bgcolor="#CCCCFF"
| Home team
| Home team score
| Away team
| Away team score
| Venue
| Crowd
| Date
|- bgcolor="#FFFFFF"
| 
| 22.11 (143)
| 
| 13.16 (94)
| MCG
| 24,307
| 25 August 1973
|- bgcolor="#FFFFFF"
| 
| 17.11 (113)
| 
| 14.14 (98)
| Kardinia Park
| 15,489
| 25 August 1973
|- bgcolor="#FFFFFF"
| 
| 16.18 (114)
| 
| 14.12 (96)
| Moorabbin Oval
| 29,257
| 25 August 1973
|- bgcolor="#FFFFFF"
| 
| 13.22 (100)
| 
| 9.23 (77)
| Junction Oval
| 14,875
| 25 August 1973
|- bgcolor="#FFFFFF"
| 
| 10.15 (75)
| 
| 9.12 (66)
| Western Oval
| 18,988
| 25 August 1973
|- bgcolor="#FFFFFF"
| 
| 16.10 (106)
| 
| 13.10 (88)
| VFL Park
| 48,059
| 25 August 1973

Round 22

Ladder

Finals series

Week one

Week two

Week three

Week four

Awards
 The 1973 VFL Premiership team was Richmond.
 The VFL's leading goalkicker was Peter McKenna of Collingwood who kicked 84 goals (including 2 goals in the finals).
 The winner of the 1973 Brownlow Medal was Keith Greig of North Melbourne with 27 votes.
 South Melbourne took the "wooden spoon" in 1973.
Richmond 17.18 (120) defeated  8.12 (60) in the grand final, held as a curtain-raiser to the seniors Grand Final at the Melbourne Cricket Ground on 29 September.

Notable events
 The VFL introduced a new clearance system, "10-year rule", in order to render the VFL immune from the sorts of "restraint of trade" difficulties that were being experienced, at the time, in New South Wales in relation to Rugby League footballers, whereby any VFL player who had played ten years with a single club was eligible for a free transfer to the club of his choice. 
Although twenty-two VFL players were eligible to do so, only six players, George Bisset (Footscray to Collingwood), Barry Davis (Essendon to North Melbourne), Carl Ditterich (St Kilda to Melbourne), Adrian Gallagher (Carlton to Footscray), John Rantall (South Melbourne to North Melbourne), and Doug Wade (Geelong to North Melbourne) took advantage of the new rule. The rule was rescinded in May 1973.
The new North Melbourne coach Ron Barassi recruited champion half-backs Barry Davis (who had already played 218 games for Essendon), John Rantall (who had already played 174 games for South Melbourne), and champion full-forward Doug Wade (who had already played 208 games for Geelong). North Melbourne improved from last place in 1972 to sixth in 1973.
 In Round 11 Kevin Murray played his 300th game for Fitzroy.
 In Round 21, Hawthorn full-forward Peter Hudson, who had been injured in Round 1 of 1972, returned to the VFL. He beat four opponents and kicked 8 goals.
 In Round 22, Hawthorn hosted its last senior VFL football match at Glenferrie Oval. The ground was notable for its temperamental playing surface and narrow flanks (wedged between the railway line on the one side and houses on the other). The venue had long been described by football fans as "the sardine can." Hawthorn subsequently played its home games at Princes Park for the next eighteen seasons.
 The Richmond Football Club won the premiership in all grades in 1973: its Senior Team, Reserves Team and Under-19 team all won their Grand Finals at the Melbourne Cricket Ground on Grand Final Day; and the Essex Heights Football Club, which served as Richmond's Under-17 team, won the South-East Suburban League premiership.

References

Bibliography
 Hogan, P., The Tigers of Old, The Richmond Football Club, (Richmond), 1996. 
 Maplestone, M., Flying Higher: History of the Essendon Football Club 1872–1996, Essendon Football Club, (Melbourne), 1996. 
 Rogers, S. & Brown, A., Every Game Ever Played: VFL/AFL Results 1897–1997 (Sixth Edition), Viking Books, (Ringwood), 1998. 
 Ross, J. (ed), 100 Years of Australian Football 1897–1996: The Complete Story of the AFL, All the Big Stories, All the Great Pictures, All the Champions, Every AFL Season Reported, Viking, (Ringwood), 1996.

External links
 1973 Season – AFL Tables

Australian Football League seasons
Season